Stuart Bowman may refer to:
Stuart Bowman (actor), Scottish actor
Stuart Bowman (canoeist) (born 1975), British slalom canoeist